Granbury Regional Airport  is a city-owned, public-use airport located two nautical miles (4 km) west of the central business district of Granbury, a city in Hood County, Texas, United States. Formerly known as Granbury Municipal Airport, it is included in the National Plan of Integrated Airport Systems for 2011–2015, which categorized it as a general aviation facility.

Although most U.S. airports use the same three-letter location identifier for the FAA and IATA, this airport is assigned GDJ by the FAA but has no designation from the IATA (which assigned GDJ to Gandajika Airport in Gandajika, DR Congo).

Facilities and aircraft 
Granbury Regional Airport covers an area of 76 acres (31 ha) at an elevation of 778 feet (237 m) above mean sea level. It has one runway designated 14/32 with an asphalt surface measuring 3,603 by 60 feet (1,098 x 18 m).

For the 12-month period ending February 5, 2009, the airport had 26,700 general aviation aircraft operations, an average of 73 per day. At that time there were 59 aircraft based at this airport: 86% single-engine, 10% multi-engine, 2% jet, and 2% helicopter.

References

External links 
 Airport page at City of Granbury website
  at Texas DOT Airport Directory
 Aerial image as of January 1996 from USGS The National Map
 

Airports in Texas
Transportation in Hood County, Texas